2021 The Citadel Bulldogs baseball team represented The Citadel in the 2021 NCAA Division I baseball season.  The Bulldogs played their home games at Joseph P. Riley Jr. Park in Charleston, South Carolina. The team was coached by Tony Skole, in his 4th season at The Citadel.

Previous season
The Bulldogs finished the COVID-19 shortened season with a 10–6 record, including a 9–1 start.

Personnel

Roster

Coaches

Schedule

References

Citadel
The Citadel Bulldogs baseball seasons
Citadel baseball